In France the jurisdictions of the ordre judiciaire, of the French court system are empowered to try either litigation between persons (civil law) or criminal law cases. They may intervene: 
 in the matter of contention in litigation between persons
 in the domaine gracieux (when the jurisdiction is asked to authorize something, a change of marital status for example)
On an exceptional basis the judiciary may also become involved in certain litigation between an individual and the State or some other public person. Such litigation would include matters of expropriation, for example, where the expropriated party does not agree with the indemnification amount. Traffic accidents in which one of the vehicles belongs to the government would also fall under the jurisdiction of this court, as well, in this instance, as that of the juge civil, who also has the power to act; another example would be a case when the propriety of a contrôle d'identité is contested and needs to be determined.

Legal context 
Two degrés de juridiction, (degrees of jurisdiction), often exist in French law:

 One jurisdiction where the facts of the matter are judged For example, in penal law: did the defendant in fact do what he is accused of? 
 The other jurisdiction is law. For example, also in penal law: if the defendant did do that, what legal rules apply?

The Court of Cassation hears appeals of the verdicts rendered by the courts of the above two jurisdictions. The Court of Cassaction itself only judges matters of law; it does not re-try the facts a third time.

The French legal system distinguishes between
 civil jurisdictions charged with litigation between persons, and 
 penal jurisdictions, which judge accusations of criminality and may apply sanctions pénales, criminal penalties.

Evolution since the French Revolution 
The organization of the French judiciary was first addressed by the loi des 16 et 24 août 1790, (law of August 16 and 24 1790), which established the justices de paix, (justices of the peace), as well as the tribunaux de districts, (district tribunals). The justices and the tribunaux served in turn as courts of first instance, (première instance) and appeal courts, in rotation. The same law also provided for tribunaux de commerce, commercial tribunals.

For criminal and penal matters, tribunaux criminels (criminal tribunals), which included a jury, were created.

The Constitution of the Year VIII reorganized the court system. It retained the justices of the peace but separated the courts of first instance from the appeal tribunals, which would become the appeal courts.

The first juridictions de prud'hommes were created in 1806. In penal matters, judgment by a jury is reserved for crimes, a serious crime punishable by ten years or more in prison.

In 1958, justices of the peace were eliminated and replaced by the tribunaux d'instance, tribunaux de police, and the tribunaux de grande instance (also tribunaux correctionnels). Les juridictions de proximité were introduced in 2002, but were scheduled to be eliminated starting January 1, 2013.

First-degree civil jurisdictions 

The first-degree civil jurisdiction is so specific that it may be divided into several subjects areas (commercial, social, rural, etc.). These courts then have the deciding word in those subjects.

Other first-degree civil jurisdictions have a more general purview, but are divided by the taux de ressort, most often as the applicant requests.

This is the case in the following jurisdictions:
 Tribunal de grande instance
 Tribunal d'instance
 Juridiction de proximité
Where litigation is not specifically assigned by legislation to another jurisdiction, the tribunal de grande instance is responsible for litigation on matters involving more than 10 €000. But for litigation arising from real estate, the tribunal d'instance has authority over litigation evaluated where potential damages range between 4 €000 and €10,000, and the juridiction de proximité for litigation evaluated at 4 000 € or less.

In the overseas French possessions (collectivités d'outre-mer), naming sometimes differs from this pattern and a court of first instance (tribunal de première instance) exercises a general review power over first-degree civil jurisdiction.

The Agricultural land tribunals are responsible for some types of rural litigation.

Social jurisdictions

Commercial jurisdictions

Jurisdictions of Sécurité sociale and of aid sociale

Civil juvenile jurisdiction 
The juge des enfants (juvenile judge),  according to Article 151-3 of the Code de l'organisation judiciaire, may rule in any matter that concerns educational assistance measures under the conditions specified at Article 375.

First Degree Penal Jurisdictions 

There are two categories of criminal jurisdiction: jurisdictions d'instruction and the jurisdictions de jugement. This distinction is notably echoed by the Code de procédure pénale, (Code of Penal Procedure), which nevertheless does not define how to distinguish the one from the other. The distinction is even more nuanced to make, since in French procedural law the "judgment" jurisdictions also have powers of investigation (d'instruction).

A jurisdiction d'instruction has powers of criminal investigation and can proceed or cause to proceed different investigations: it can hear witnesses and civil parties (parties civiles), search, seal, appoint and expert, put a suspect in temporary detention or in detention under judiciary supervision, and rule on the different questions that arise in the course of criminal investigation, such as the return of seized assets.

A judge in a court de jugement has the same powers, but generally makes only limited use of them, since the juge d'instruction has already done so. The essential function of a cour de judgement is to determine the guilt of defendants under criminal law and to sentence those it finds guilty.

Penal jurisdictions judge infractions, and they also determine the civil consequences of committing the infraction.

First-degree jurisdictions d'instruction

First-degree jurisdictions de jugement 
The tribunal de police judges contraventions. The tribunal correctionnel judges délits. The cour d'assises and the criminal tribunal (in Saint-Pierre-et-Miquelon) judge crimes, according to where they were committed. The commercial maritime tribunal is a jurisdiction d'exception, but it has been composed in the same way as jurisdictions of common law such as the correctional tribunal since the decision of the constitutional council of July 2, 2010.

First-degree jurisdictions for penalty application 
The juge de l'application des peines and the tribunal de l'application des peines decide the application of criminal penalties, especially with respect to prisoners.

Eight regional jurisdictions for rétention de sûreté decide matters of retention, after their periods of incarceration, of persons found guilty of certain serious offences and who are adjudged to still be dangerous.

Military jurisdictions 
The elimination of the tribunal aux armées de Paris, the last peacetime military tribunal, was announced for 2011, when they were to be replaced by the common-law correctional tribunal. It took effect 1 January 2012 as a result of the law of 13 December 2011.

Juvenile criminal jurisdictions 
Infractions committed by a minor are judged, depending on their severity and also the age of the minor, by the juge des enfants, by the tribunal pour enfants or by the Cour d'assises des mineurs.

Appeal jurisdictions

Court of Appeal 
The Court of Appeal retries the facts of a disputed case previously tried in a court of first instance. This is known as the double degree of jurisdiction (double degré de juridiction).

At the Court of Appeal level litigation is considered by a single court—although in separate divisions—whether the matter is civil or criminal. Depending on the volume of appeals the number of divisions may vary. There is always, however, at least one civil division, social division, commercial division, and correctional appeals division.

There are a total of 36 courts of appeal on French territory.

At the courts of appeal, in criminal law matters:
 the chambre de l'instruction is the appeal court's jurisdiction d'instruction;
 the chambre des appels correctionnels is the jurisdiction judgement d'appel, concerning délits and contraventions. For a contravention the case is heard by a single judge.
 the chambre de l'application des peines is an appeal jurisdiction for matters of sentencing, particularly if a loss of liberty is involved.

Tribunal supérieur d'appel 

Juridictions criminelles d'appel 
Since the 2000 , known as the loi Guigou, a special form of d'appeal (called "tournant") been available against the arrêts of the Assises court, and the Criminal and Army tribunals: appeals are heard in a different criminal jurisdiction with additional jurés in the case of an Assises court or Criminal tribunal, or assesseurs-jurés in Mayotte). (Although appeals filed against a criminal jurisdiction ruling in an overseas department, New Caledonia, French Polynesia, Wallis and Futuna or Saint Pierre and Miquelon, the appeal may be heard in the same jurisdiction that heard it in first instance, but different judges should sit on the panel that re-tries the case.

Rétention de sûreté 
It hears appeals of decisions to impose preventive detention on convicted prisoners who have completed their sentence but are still considered dangerous.

Cour nationale de l'incapacité et de la tarification de l'assurance des accidents du travail 
This jurisdiction judges cases where appeals concern incapacitation and work-related injury, sometimes called technical appeals, rendered by the Social Security administration.

High jurisdiction - Court of Cassation 
The Court of Cassation does not constitute a third degree of jurisdiction, because unlike the Courts of Appeal, it only addresses the legal form of the verdict. Thus the juges du fond designation for first and second degree judges, which sometimes appears in cassation court verdicts.

The Cour de cassation renders two types of verdict: confirmatif or  infirmatif.

The former confirms a verdict by a court of appeal, (or of another court if the case has exhausted the first and last degrees of jurisdiction). The trial theoretically ends at this point, all avenues of recourse having been exhausted. Still, other jurisdictions may be invoked, such as the European Court of Human Rights, but this remains rare.

If the court's verdict is on the other hand infirmatif, the judgment is "cassé", or broken, essentially quashed or canceled. There are then several possibilities:
 The judgment is quashed and sent back to a jurisdiction of the same degree as the one that issued the overturned judgment, but in a different place.
 The judgment is quashed and sent back to the same jurisdiction that issued it, but is then heard by a court composed of different judges.
 The judgment is quashed, but not sent back to the lower courts.
If the matter is sent back to the lower courts, both the facts and the law are retried. The resulting new judgment may also be appealed. The next higher court would be cassation. Here the bench sometimes quashes a verdict without returning it to the lower court, or where a lower court may bow to the Cour de cassation by rendering a judgment that takes the cassation court's ruling into account.

Unlike the Courts of Appeal, there is only one Cour de cassation, which sits in Paris.

See also

Notes and references 

Judiciaries
Judiciary of France
Courts in France